This page includes a list of biblical proper names that start with H in English transcription. Some of the names are given with a proposed etymological meaning. For further information on the names included on the list, the reader may consult the sources listed below in the References and External Links.

A – B – C – D – E – F – G – H – I – J – K – L – M – N – O – P – Q – R – S – T – U – V – Y – Z

H

Haahashtari
Habaiah
Habakkuk
Habazziniah
Habor
Hachaliah
Hachilah
Hachmoni
Hadad
Hadadezer
Hadadrimmon
Hadar
Hadarezer
Hadashah
Hadassah
Hadattah, new, NEW HAZOR 
Hades, see Hell (the grave or place of the dead),  “brought down to hell” (hades), i.e., simply to the lowest debasement, descent of Christ into Hell, the death and burial of Jesus, The abode of departed spirits 
Hadlai
Hadoram
Hadrach
Hagab
Hagabah, grasshopper
Hagar
Haggai
Haggeri
Haggiah
Haggith
Hai, same as Ai = heap of ruins 
Hakkatan
Hakkoz
Hakupha
Halah
Halak
Halhul
Hali (biblical place)
Hallelujah
Hallohesh
Ham
Haman
Hamath
Hamath-zobah
Hammedatha
Hammelech
Hammoleketh, the queen
Hammon (biblical place)
Hamonah
Hamon-gog
Hamor
Hamul
Hamutal
Hanameel
Hanan
Hananeel
Hanani
Hananiah
Hanes
Haniel
Hannah
Hannathon
Hanniel
Hanoch
Hanun
Hapharaim
Hara
Haradah
Haran
Harbonah
Hareph
Harhaiah
Harhur
Harhas
Harim
Harnepher
Harod
Harosheth
Harran
Harsha
Harum (biblical figure)
Harumaph
Haruphite
Haruz
Hasadiah
Hashabiah
Hashabnah
Hashem
Hashub
Hashubah
Hashum
Hashupha
Hasrah
Hatach
Hathath
Hatita
Hattill
Hattush
Hauran
Havilah
Havoth-Jair
Hazael
Hazaiah
Hazar-addar
Hazar-enan
Hazar-gaddah
Hazar-hatticon
Hazarmaveth
Hazar-shual
Hazar-susah, or -susim
Hazeroth
Hazzelelponi
Hazezon-tamar
Hazo
Hazor
Heber
Hebrews
Hebron
Hegai, or Hege
Helam
Helbah, Helbon
Heldai, Heleb, Heled
Helek
Helem
Heleph
Helez
Heli
Helkai
Helkath-hazzurim
Helon
Heman
Hen
Hena, "he has driven away"
Henadad
Henoch
Hepher
Hephzibah
Heres
Heresh
Hermas
Hermogenes
Hermon
Herod
Herodion
Heshbon
Heshmon
Heth
Hethlon
Hezekiah
Hezir
Hezrai
Hezron
Hiddai
Hiel
Hierapolis
Hilen
Hilkiah
Hillel
Hinnom
Hirah
Hiram
Hittite
Hivites
Hizkijah
Hobab
Hobah
Hod (biblical figure)
Hodaiah
Hodaviah
Hodesh
Hoglah
Hoham
Holon
Homam
Hophni
Hophra
Hor
Horeb
Horem
Hor-hagidgad
Hori
Horims
Hormah
Horonaim
Horinites
Hosah
Hosanna
Hosea
Hoshaiah
Hoshama
Hotham
Hothir
Hukkok
Hul
Huldah
Hupham
Huppim
Hur
Huram
Huri
Hushah
Hushai
Hushathite
Huz
Huzoth
Huzzab
Hymeneus

References
Comay, Joan, Who's Who in the Old Testament, Oxford University Press, 1971,  
Lockyer, Herbert, All the men of the Bible, Zondervan Publishing House (Grand Rapids, Michigan), 1958
Lockyer, Herbert, All the women of the Bible, Zondervan Publishing 1988, 
Lockyer, Herbert, All the Divine Names and Titles in the Bible, Zondervan Publishing 1988,  
Tischler, Nancy M., All things in the Bible: an encyclopedia of the biblical world , Greenwood Publishing, Westport, Conn. : 2006

Inline references 

H